In United States history, an Indian agent was an individual authorized to interact with  American Indian tribes on behalf of the government.

Background
The federal regulation of Indian affairs in the United States first included development of the position of Indian agent in 1793 under the Second Trade and Intercourse Act (or the Nonintercourse Act). This required land sales by or from Indians to be federally licensed and permitted. The legislation also authorized the president of the United States to "appoint such persons, from time to time, as temporary agents to reside among the Indians," and guide them into acculturation of American society by changing their agricultural practices and domestic activities. Eventually, the U.S. government ceased using the word "temporary" in the Indian agent's job title.

History, 1800–1840s
From the close of the 18th century to nearly 1869, Congress maintained the position that it was legally responsible for the protection of Indians from non-Indians, and in establishing this responsibility it "continue[d] to deal with Indian tribes by utilizing agents to negotiate treaties under the jurisdiction of the Department of War."

  Initially, and before the reforms of the late 19th century, an Indian agent's average duties were as follows:
 Work toward preventing conflicts between settlers and Indians
 "He was to keep an eye out for violations of intercourse laws and to report them [violations] to superintendents"
 Maintain flexible cooperation with U.S. Army military personnel
 See to the proper distribution of annuities granted by the state or federal government to various Indian tribes; and this usually occurred through a transfer of money or goods from the Indian agent to the respective chief which would then be distributed to the tribe, although this practice went into decline by the mid-1800s
 See to the successful removal of tribes from areas procured for settlement to reservations

In the 1830s, the primary role of Indian agents was to assist in commercial trading supervision between traders and Indians, while agents possessed the authority to both issue and revoke commercial trading licenses.

In 1849, the Bureau of Indian Affairs decided to place the position of Indian agent under civilian jurisdiction. This came at a time when many white Americans saw the role of Indian agent as largely inefficient and dishonest in monetary and severalty dealings with various Indian tribes.

Mid-late 19th century
By 1850, many citizens had been calling for reform of the agents in the Bureau of Indian Affairs.  Their wish had been granted when in 1869 the bureau created the civilian-controlled Board of Indian Commissioners.  The board "never more deeply felt, that Indian agents should be appointed solely for merit and fitness for their work... and should be retained in the service when they prove themselves to be efficient and helpful by their character and moral influence." This civilian run board was charged "with responsibility for supervising the disbursement of Indian appropriations" from state and federal governments. However, the United States Army command was extremely dissatisfied of the transfer of the Bureau of Indian Affairs from the Department of War to the Department of the Interior by 1849, so they began to make public complaints about the corruptive nature of the civilian presence in the job of Indian agent. Despite its deeply felt convictions that its Indian agents were appointed and removed on merit, the civilian Board of Commissioners was frequently deemed corrupt, portrayed derogatorily in print and propaganda, and inadvertently assumed the scapegoat for the perceived inefficiency of Indian-White affairs: the Indian agent.

By the late 19th century, the job title of Indian agent began to change slightly in the wake of the recent attempts to 'civilize' Indians, assimilating them into American culture. Despite the public scorn for the agents, the Indian Office stated that the "chief duty of an agent is to induce his Indian to labor in civilized pursuits. To attain this end every possible influence should be brought to bear, and in proportion as it is attained... an agent is successful or unsuccessful."

By the 1870s, due to president Grant's Peace Policy, the average Indian agent was primarily nominated by various Christian denominations due to the increase in civilization reforms to Indian-white affairs, especially over land.  Part of the Christian message of reform, carried out by the Indian agents, demonstrated the pervasive thought of Indian land ownership of the late 19th century: civilization can only be possible when Indians cease communal living in favor of private ownership. Many citizens still held the activities of Indian agents in poor esteem, calling the agents themselves "unprincipled opportunists" and people of low quality.

 In the 1880 Instruction to Indian Agents, it states the job duties of the Indian agent as follows:
 See that Indians in one's designated locality are not "idle for want of an opportunity to labor or of instructions as to how to go to work," and
 absolutely "no work must be given to white men which can be done by Indians"
 See to it that the Indians under one's jurisdiction can farm successfully and solely for the subsistence of their respective family
 Enforce prohibition of liquor
 Both provide and supervise the instruction of English education and industrial training for Indian children
 Allow Indians to leave the reservation only if they have acquired a permit for such (permits were only irregularly granted)
As of July 1884, Indian agents were to compile an annual report of their reservations for submission aimed at collecting the following information from Indian respondents: Indian name, English name, Relationship, Sex, and Name among other statistical information.

End of position
When Theodore Roosevelt reached the presidency at the turn of the 20th century (1901–1909), the Indian agents that remained on the government payroll were all replaced by school superintendents.

Notable Indian agents

Individuals who have served as Indian agents include the following:
Charles Adams, Indian agent for the Ute Mountain Agency, 1870–1874
Robert Alden, Indian Agent for the Fort Berthold Agency in the Dakota Territory, 1877–1877. Known as Rev. Robert Alden in Laura Ingalls Wilder's books. 
 Kit Carson, Indian agent to the Ute Indians and the Jicarilla Apaches, 1850s
Leander Clark, Indian agent for the Sac and Fox in Iowa beginning in 1866
John Clum, Indian agent for the San Carlos Apache Indian Reservation in the Arizona Territory
Douglas H. Cooper, agent for the Choctaw Nation in 1853 and Chickasaw Nation in 1856; resigned to serve as a military officer in the Confederate Army in 1860.
John Crowell, Alabama's first member of the House of Representatives, then agent to the Creek people
Brinton Darlington, Indian agent at Darlington Agency to the Cheyenne and Arapaho, 1869–1872
George Davenport, Indian agent for the Sac and Fox in Illinois and Iowa, after the War of 1812 through the Black Hawk War of 1832
Aaron Freeman, agent to the Chowan in North Carolina from 1770 to 1810. Freeman also ran a tavern in Rowan and owned 250 acres of land.
Benjamin Hawkins, agent to the Creek people and other southern Indians under Presidents George Washington, John Adams, and Thomas Jefferson. One of the most successful agents.
Luther Kelly (Yellowstone Kelly), Indian Agent for the San Carlos Apache Indian Reservation; Arizona Territory under President Theodore Roosevelt, 1904–1909
Valentine McGillycuddy, Indian agent of Red Cloud Agency
James McLaughlin active 1876–1923, Devils Lake Agency (1876–1881), Standing Rock Sioux Agency (1881–?)
Nathan Meeker, Indian agent for the White River Utes for a brief time, 1878–1879, until killed in the Meeker Massacre
Return J. Meigs Sr., agent to the Cherokee in Tennessee from 1801 to 1823
 John DeBras Miles, Indian agent for the Kickapoo Agency, 1868–1871. Indian agent for the Cheyenne and Arapaho, 1878–1884. 
Major Laban J. Miles, Indian agent at Osage Agency to the Osage and Kaw, 1878–1893. Uncle of president Herbert Hoover.
Abel C. Pepper, Indian agent in Indiana
Robert Latham Owen, Indian agent in Indian Territory 1886–1890.  Part-Cherokee by birth, Owen was later elected one of the first two U.S. senators from Oklahoma.
Henry Schoolcraft, agent to the Ojibwe in Michigan in the 1820s and 1830s
Lawrie Tatum, Indian agent at Fort Sill Agency to the Kiowa and Comanche. Guardian of future President Herbert Hoover and his siblings Theodore and Mary.
John Q. Tufts, Indian agent in Muskogee Indian Territory, 1879–1887
William Wells, Indian agent from 1792 to 1812; considered a "white Indian" because of his former association with the Miami Indians and role as an Indian agent interpreter
Major David John Mosher Wood, Indian agent for the Ponca, Pawnee, Otoe, and Oakland Agency, in the Indian Territory, 1889–1893. Brother of Col. Samuel Newitt Wood.
O. M. Wozencraft, Indian agent in California, 1850–1852
George Bingenheimer, agent at Standing Rock, 1898-1903

See also 
 William Holland Thomas
 Bureau of Indian Affairs
 Indian agency police
 Board of Indian Commissioners
 Department of War
 Department of the Interior

References

Works cited
 "Indian Agents: Rulers of the Reserves" By John L. Steckley, 2016 Peter Lang Publishing
 "Indian Agent: Peter Ellis Bean in Mexican Texas" By Jack Jackson, 2005 Texas A&M University Press
 "The Silver Man: The Life and Times of Indian Agent John Kinzie" By Peter Shrake, 2016 Wisconsin Historical Society
 "The Official Correspondence of James S. Calhoun: While Indian Agent at Santa Fé and Superintendent of Indian Affairs in New Mexico" by James S. Calhoun, 1915 U.S. Government Printing Office
 "Christopher Gist: Colonial Frontiersman, Explorer, and Indian Agent" by Kenneth P. Bailey, 1976 Archon Books

External links

 Encyclopedia of Oklahoma History and Culture – Indian Agencies
Fort Wayne Indian Agency Collection at the William L. Clements Library

Indigenous affairs ministries
United States federal Indian policy
United States Indian agents